Duke Frederick III of Austria (31 March 1347 – 10 December 1362) was the second son of Duke Albert II of Austria and a younger brother of Duke Rudolf IV. He was born and died in Vienna, where he is buried in the Ducal Crypt.

Ancestry

14th-century House of Habsburg
1347 births
1362 deaths
Sons of monarchs